The International Baseball Federation (IBAF;) is the former worldwide governing body recognized by the International Olympic Committee as overseeing, deciding and executing the policy of the sport of baseball. The IBAF has since become the international baseball "Division" of the World Baseball Softball Confederation, the officially recognized world governing body for baseball (and softball). One of its principal responsibilities under the WBSC umbrella is to organize, standardize and sanction international competitions, using the WBSC name, among baseball's 124 national governing bodies through its various tournaments to determine a world champion and calculate world rankings for both men's and women's baseball. Prior to the establishment of the WBSC, which has since superseded its authority, the IBAF had been the lone entity that can assign the title of "world champion" to any baseball team delegated to represent a nation. Its offices are housed within the WBSC headquarters in Lausanne, Switzerland—the Olympic Capital.

History

The first-ever international baseball event was a series of exhibition games that took place during the 1904 Summer Olympics in St. Louis, United States. The exhibition proved so successful that it was given an encore at the 1912 Summer Olympics in Stockholm, Sweden.

The two popular showings in St. Louis and Stockholm laid the groundwork for baseball's international surge in popularity, leading the sport to be placed onto the program as an exhibition sport at the 1936 Summer Olympics. This exhibition was extremely well received as 92,565 spectators filled the Olympic Stadium in Berlin to watch a game between two teams from the US.

Following the success of Berlin, the first ever Baseball World Cup was organized in London, England, in August 1938.  The United States and Great Britain engaged in five games, of which the British won four.

The growth of baseball competitions involving the representation of countries, coupled with the birth of the Baseball World Cup, provided the need for an institution to help develop, organize, regulate and oversee these events, thus the International Baseball Federation was established in 1938.

Conflicts of World War II prompted the IOC to cancel the Summer Games that had been scheduled to take place in Tokyo in 1940 and in London in 1944, thereby halting baseball's tour as a demonstration sport.  Nevertheless, by 1950, the IBAF was able to expand the format of the Baseball World Cup that was contested in Managua, Nicaragua, to 12 participating countries.

In 1951, the Pan American Games were established and baseball was on the official program from the onset.

In 1952, a Finnish version of baseball (Pesäpallo) was a demonstration sport at the 1952 Summer Olympics in Helsinki, Finland.

In April 1953, Belgium, France, Germany, Italy and Spain came together to establish what is now known as the Confederation of European Baseball and organized the first ever European Baseball Championship a year later.

The Baseball Federation of Asia (BFA) was founded in May 1954 as the second continental confederation under the umbrella of the IBAF. The BFA wasted little time in organizing its first continental tournament, as it celebrated the Asian Baseball Championship in December of that same year in Manila, Philippines.

The exposure of baseball to an international audience continued at the 1956 Summer Olympics, which saw approximately 114,000 spectators slowly fill the Melbourne Cricket Ground to witness Australia vs. US in a demonstration contest in Melbourne, Australia. This crowd of 114,000 was registered as a Guinness World Record for the largest attendance for any single baseball game.  (The record lasted over 50 years before it was broken at a March 29, 2008 Major League Baseball exhibition game between the Boston Red Sox and Los Angeles Dodgers that drew 115,300 people to the Los Angeles Memorial Coliseum.)

Baseball as an Olympic demonstration sport was finally able to take its act to Asia at the 1964 Summer Olympics in Tokyo, Japan, where baseball was already exceptionally popular.

At the following 1968 Summer Olympics, a selection of premier U.S. college players defeated the Cuba national team twice in Mexico City to win the tournament.

In 1973, the IBAF added the Intercontinental Cup to its tournament program.

In 1978, the IOC awarded the hosting rights of the 1984 Summer Olympics to Los Angeles, and Robert Smith quickly went to work, in his capacity as a member of the United States Olympic Committee prior to becoming IBAF President, to reestablish baseball as part of the Olympic Programme. Smith reached out to the then-Los Angeles Dodgers owner, Peter O'Malley, and University of Southern California head baseball coach and subsequent College Baseball Hall of Fame inductee, Rod Dedeaux. The group organized an IBAF congress the following year in Los Angeles in order to establish an Olympic Baseball Committee. Through these efforts, baseball was again categorized as a demonstration sport and an eight-team tournament was organized at Dodger Stadium, as part of the official Summer Olympic Programme. The present IBAF President, Riccardo Fraccari, was the head umpire of the championship game.

A third branch of the IBAF continental confederations formed in 1985. The Pan American Baseball Confederation (COPABE) was finally established after it was deemed necessary due to the strong expansion and increase of the national member federations stemming from the Olympic Baseball Committee campaign.    
 
In 1986, a historic IOC vote put baseball onto the Olympic Programme as a medal sport for the 1992 Summer Olympics in Barcelona, Spain.

Baseball would travel to Seoul, Korea, for the 1988 Summer Olympics. This was the final time the IBAF, in conjunction with the IOC, would organize baseball as a demonstration sport at the Olympics before it became an official medal sport in 1992.

In 1989, the Baseball Confederation of Oceania (BCO) was established as the 4th branch of the IBAF.
 
The African Baseball and Softball Association (ABSA) was formed soon after the BCO in June 1990 in Lagos, Nigeria

Baseball was played up in a traditional amateur format up until the 1996 Summer Olympics in Atlanta, US.

In 1998, the IBAF, MLB and Major League Baseball Players Association reached an agreement to allow the participation of professional players in international competition.

Team USA used a minor league selection to beat Cuba in the gold medal game at the 2000 Summer Olympics in Sydney, Australia.

Cuba regained the world title, defeating Australia for the gold medal at the 2004 Summer Olympics in Athens, Greece.

On July 7, 2005, the IOC Session voted to remove baseball and softball from the 2012 Summer Olympics program.

Baseball made its last Olympic appearance and Korea took the gold medal at the Beijing 2008 Summer Olympics.

The IBAF, under President Harvey Schiller, attempted to reinstate baseball onto the Olympic Programme, but the IOC vote of August 2009 kept baseball off the 2016 program, as golf and rugby were selected.

In February 2011, Dr. Harvey Schiller was appointed as a member of the IOC's Women and Sport Commission.
 
On April 1, 2011, the IBAF, under first-year President Riccardo Fraccari, and the International Softball Federation announced that they were studying how to prepare a joint proposal in order to revive play of both sports at the 2020 Summer Olympics.
As part of that proposal, in April 2013, the two organizations began the process of merging into a new combined federation that will govern both sports, the World Baseball Softball Confederation (WBSC).

The merging was concluded in 2015, and WBSC managed to obtain the bid for 2020 Games on following months.

International events

The International Baseball Federation organized the following world championship tournaments before WBSC merger:
WBSC Premier 12
World Baseball Classic
IBAF Women's Baseball World Cup
IBAF 23U Baseball World Cup (formerly 21U)
IBAF 18U Baseball World Cup
IBAF 15U Baseball World Cup (formerly 16U)
IBAF 12U Baseball World Cup

The first-ever 12U Baseball World Championship was played in Taipei from July 8 to 17, 2011.  Taiwan won the first title.

In addition, the IBAF is the sanctioning body for the World Baseball Classic, which is hosted by Major League Baseball and the Major League Baseball Players Association and held every four years in the year after the Summer Olympics. The IBAF abandoned its former world championship, the Baseball World Cup, after the 2011 edition in favor of an expanded World Baseball Classic. It was originally intended to be the sanctioning body for the Premier 12, a new men's international tournament – featuring the twelve best-ranked national teams – that began in 2015; that tournament instead has been sanctioned by the WBSC. This event is played in the year preceding the Summer Olympics.

The IBAF discontinued the Intercontinental Cup, which was an invitational event and last held in 2010.

International baseball demographics
Estimated data, according to the IBAF, as of April 2011:
Number of countries with an organized baseball league: 77 
Number of total participants in organized baseball competitions worldwide: 35,000,000 (million)
Number of female athletes: 300,000 
Number of athletes with a disability: 200,000
Number of visually impaired athletes: 2,175  
Number of registered youth baseball teams: 273,366
Number of Players (ages 7–18) registered by youth leagues: 3,999,760
 
IBAF Global Baseball Video

Organizational structure

The IBAF comprises five continental confederations that currently represent a total of 127 national member federations.

 IBAF Africa: African Baseball & Softball Association (ABSA) - 24 member countries
 IBAF Oceania: Baseball Confederation of Oceania (BCO) - 14 member countries
 IBAF Asia: Baseball Federation of Asia (BFA) - 24 member countries
 IBAF Europe: Confederation of European Baseball (CEB) - 38 member countries
 IBAF Americas: Pan American Baseball Confederation (COPABE) - 27 member countries

Presidents

 Leslie Mann: 1938
 Jaime Mariné: 1939 to 1943
 Jorge Reyes: 1944 to 1945
 Pablo Morales: 1946 to 1947
 Chale Pereira: 1948 to 1950
 Pablo Morales: 1951 to 1952
 Carlos M. Zecca: 1953 to 1968
 FIBA: Juan Isa: 1969 to 1975 (FIBA from 1973 to 1975)
 FEMBA: William Fehring: 1973 to 1974
 FEMBA: Carlos J. García: 1975
 Manuel González Guerra: 1976 to 1979
 Robert E. Smith: 1981 to 1993
 Aldo Notari: 1993 to 2006 (*)
 Tom Peng: 2006 to 2007
 Harvey Schiller: 2007 to 2009
 Riccardo Fraccari: 2009 to present

(*) Aldo Notari died during the period as the president, thus the first vice president, Tom Peng of Taiwan, served as acting president from July 2006 to 2007.

Awards
See also: Baseball awards of the International Baseball Fedederation (IBAF)
Senior Athlete of the Year
Junior Athlete of the Year
Coach of the Year
Umpire of the Year
Member Federation Executive of the Year

See also

World Baseball Softball Confederation

Footnotes

External links

International Baseball Federation website

 
 
International sports organizations
World Baseball Classic
Bas
Baseball
Sports organizations established in 1938
Organisations based in Lausanne

Articles containing video clips